At the 1956 Summer Olympics, 16 wrestling events were contested, all for men. There were eight weight classes in Greco-Roman wrestling and eight classes in freestyle wrestling.

Medal table

Medal summary

Greco-Roman

Freestyle

Participating nations

A total of 173 wrestlers from 30 nations competed at the Melbourne Games:

References

External links
Official Olympic Report

 
1956 Summer Olympics events
1956
1956 in sport wrestling
International wrestling competitions hosted by Australia